Aishi Manula (born 13 September 1995) is a Tanzanian football player. He plays as a goalkeeper and represents the Tanzanian national team.

Early life 
Manula was born in Morogoro, Tanzania.

Career 
He began his career at Mtibwa Sugar FC. In 2012 he joined Azam FC at 17 years old. His performance and consistency helped him to join the first eleven replacing the Ghanaian goalkeeper Daniel Agpeyi. He joined Simba in 2017 where he helped his team to take the league cup and he took the golden glove. He helped Simba to win the league four times consecutively

References

1995 births
Living people
Association football goalkeepers
Tanzanian footballers
People from Morogoro Region
Azam F.C. players
Simba S.C. players
2019 Africa Cup of Nations players
Tanzania international footballers
Tanzanian Premier League players
Tanzania A' international footballers
2020 African Nations Championship players